Joseph Da Rin de Barbera (born 1994), who performs as Young Franco, is an Australian DJ and record producer from Brisbane, Queensland. He is based in Sydney, New South Wales.

Career
Barbera has performed at many Australian festivals including Splendour in the Grass and Falls Festival.

On 19 November 2021, Young Franco released "Real Nice (H.C.T.F.)" with Tkay Maidza featuring Nerve which served as the theme song for the A-League, the Australian and New Zealand professional soccer league.

On Friday July 29, 2022 Young Franco was the opening act on the Solana X Perry's stage at the Lollapalooza music festival in Chicago, Illinois.

Discography

Singles

Notes

Awards and nominations

Queensland Music Awards
The Queensland Music Awards (previously known as Q Song Awards) are annual awards celebrating Queensland, Australia's emerging artists. They commenced in 2006.

! 
|-
| 2021
| "Juice" (featuring Pell)
| Electronic / Dance Award
| 
| 
|}

References

External links
 
 

1995 births
Australian DJs
Australian musicians
Australian electronic musicians
Australian house musicians
Electronic dance music DJs
Living people